Daniel André (12 September 1965 – 22 September 2022) was a Mauritian sprinter. He competed in the men's 100 metres at the 1984 Summer Olympics.

References

External links
 

1965 births
2022 deaths
Athletes (track and field) at the 1984 Summer Olympics
Mauritian male sprinters
Olympic athletes of Mauritius
Place of birth missing